Charles Antony Morris (9 May 1939 – 17 November 1990) was an English first-class cricketer.

Morris was born in May 1939 at Cambridge. He was educated at Marlborough College, before going up to King's College, Cambridge. While studying at Cambridge, he made four appearances in first-class cricket for Cambridge University in 1960, appearing against Yorkshire, Hampshire, the touring South Africans and Sussex. Across his four matches, Morris scored 23 runs and bowled twelve wicketless overs with his leg break googly bowling. In addition to playing first-class cricket, he also played minor counties cricket for Cambridgeshire from 1956–63, making thirty appearances in the Minor Counties Championship. He died in November 1990 at Wilmslow, Cheshire.

References

External links

1939 births
1990 deaths
Sportspeople from Cambridge
People educated at Marlborough College
Alumni of King's College, Cambridge
English cricketers
Cambridgeshire cricketers
Cambridge University cricketers